Douglas Arthur Unger (born June 27, 1952) is an American novelist.

Life and work 

Unger was born in Moscow, Idaho. He received a BA from the University of Chicago in 1973 and a MFA from the Iowa Writers' Workshop at the University of Iowa in 1977.

Unger has written four novels, including his 1984 debut, Leaving the Land, which was a finalist for the 1985 Pulitzer Prize for Fiction and the Robert F. Kennedy Book Award, and received the Society of Midland Authors Award for Fiction and a Hemingway Foundation/PEN Special Citation.

His short stories are collected in Looking for War (2004). "Leslie and Sam", a story from that collection, was short-listed for the 2002 O. Henry Award and named a distinguished story in Best American Short Stories 2002.

He has been an editor for three literary journals—Chicago Review, The Iowa Review, and Point of Contact—as well as an essayist for the MacNeil/Lehrer News Hour and a screenwriter.

From 1983 to 1991, Unger taught creative writing at Syracuse University. During this time he advised George Saunders on his MA thesis. In 1991 he joined the faculty of the University of Nevada, Las Vegas, where he co-founded the MFA program in creative writing.

Unger was inducted into the Nevada Writers Hall of Fame in 2007.

Works

Novels
Leaving the Land (Harper & Row, 1984)
El Yanqui (Harper & Row, 1986)
The Turkey War (Harper & Row, 1988)
Voices from Silence (St. Martin's, 1995)

Story collections
Looking for War (Ontario Review Press, 2004)

References

 (Google cache page)

External links 
 Douglas Unger's website
 Unger's faculty page at the University of Nevada, Las Vegas
 "Point of Contact: 30 Years" a talk by Douglas Unger on the history of the journal Point of Contact
 An interview with Douglas Unger, by Jarret Keene from turnrow, Summer 2004 vol. 3.2
Nevada Writers Hall of Fame

1952 births
Living people
People from Moscow, Idaho
University of Iowa alumni
University of Chicago alumni
20th-century American novelists
American male novelists
Writers from Nevada
Novelists from Idaho
University of Nevada, Las Vegas faculty
Syracuse University faculty
American male short story writers
20th-century American short story writers
20th-century American male writers
Novelists from New York (state)